Jacques Cassini (18 February 1677 – 16 April 1756) was a French astronomer, son of the famous Italian astronomer Giovanni Domenico Cassini.

Cassini was born at the Paris Observatory. Admitted at the age of seventeen to membership of the French Academy of Sciences, he was elected in 1696 a fellow of the Royal Society of London, and became maître des comptes in 1706. Having succeeded to his father's position at the observatory in 1712, in 1713 he extended the Paris meridian, measuring the arc of the meridian from Dunkirk to Perpignan, and published the results in a volume entitled Traité de la grandeur et de la figure de la terre (1720). His two separate calculations for a degree of meridian arc were 57,097 toises de Paris (111.282 km) and 57,061 toises (111.211 km), giving results for Earth's radius of 3,271,420 toises (6,375.998 km) and 3,269,297 toises (6,371.860 km), respectively.

He also wrote Eléments d'astronomie on proper motion (1740), and published the first tables of the satellites of Saturn in 1716. He died at Thury, near Clermont, France.

The asteroid 24102 Jacquescassini is named after him.

Jacques Cassini married Suzanne Françoise Charpentier de Charmois. Their second son was astronomer César-François Cassini de Thury, who was also known as Cassini III.

Works
A number of his publications about astronomy  are preserved at the Paris Observatory library and available online on the digital library among them : 
 De la grandeur et de la figure de la terre, 1720 (About the size and features of Earth)
 Méthode de déterminer si la terre est sphérique ou non , 1738 (Method to determine if Earth is a sphere or not)
 Éléments d'astronomie , 1740 (Anstronomy elements)
 Traité de la Comète qui a paru en décembre 1743 & en janvier, février & mars 1744  (About the comet that appeared December 1743, January, February and March 1744)

References

External links
 
 
 Paris Observatory digital library

1677 births
1756 deaths
Scientists from Paris
18th-century French astronomers
French geodesists
French people of Italian descent
Members of the French Academy of Sciences
Fellows of the Royal Society